The 1963 Mediterranean Grand Prix was a motor race, run to Formula One rules, held on 18 August 1963 at the Autodromo di Pergusa, Sicily. The second running of the Mediterranean Grand Prix, the race was run over 60 laps of the circuit, and was dominated by British driver John Surtees in a Ferrari 156.

British driver Trevor Taylor suffered an accident during the race, in which he was thrown out of his Lotus 25 with fairly minor injuries, before the car broke up and caught fire.

Results

References

Mediterranean Grand Prix
Mediterranean Grand Prix
1963 in Italian motorsport